Octagon Building can refer to:

Philippines
 Octagon (Ortigas Center), in Pasig, Metro Manila
 A building on the campus of Polytechnic University of the Philippines Santo Tomas

United Kingdom
 Octagon, Birmingham, a residential skyscraper under construction in Birmingham, England
 The main building at University College London

United States
 Octagon Building (Santa Cruz, California)
 Octagonal Building (Mexico), part of the Mexico exhibit at the 1884 World Cotton Centennial fair in New Orleans, Louisiana
 The Octagon at Amherst College, Massachusetts
 Andrew Gildersleeve Octagonal Building, Mattituck, New York
 The Octagon (Roosevelt Island), New York
 The Octagon (Heidelberg University), Tiffin, Ohio

Elsewhere
 The Octagon (Egypt), defense headquarters for the Egyptian Ministry of Defense, in the New Administrative Capital, Egypt
 The Octagon, Christchurch, a former church in Christchurch, New Zealand

See also
 Octagon barn (disambiguation)
 Octagon Centre
 Octagon Chapel (disambiguation)
 Octagonal churches in Norway
 Octagon Hall
 Octagon Hotel
 Octagon House (disambiguation)
 Octagonal Mausoleum
 Octagonal Schoolhouse (disambiguation)
 Octagon Theatre
 The Octagon (disambiguation)
 List of octagonal buildings and structures